Louis Lorenz Stein Jr. (August 21, 1902November 11 1996) was an American pharmacist, California East Bay historian and archivist. He was best known for founding the Arlington Pharmacy in Kensington, California, the Pharmacy Museum at Columbia State Historic Park and donating his collection of historical materials to the Contra Costa County Historical Society.

Early life

Stein was born on August 21, 1902, in Berkeley, California, one of six children of German immigrant parents, Lorenz Louis Stein (1865-1953) and Dorthea Reismann (1873-1968). His father came to Berkeley in 1885 and opened up the first meat market at 1448 Shattuck Avenue, north of the old firehouse. His parents also had the Stein Ranch in Reliez Valley, California. As a child, Stein lived at 1423 Walnut Street in Berkeley and attended public schools and at Berkeley High School where he developed interests in sports and history. He attended the University of California, Berkeley in 1920, and then received a Pharmacy degree in 1924 from the School of Pharmacy. He married Mildred Slater on November 5, 1927 in Oakland, California and had two children.

On November 5, 1977, Louis and Mildred celebrated their Golden Anniversary at a reception in Piedmont, California. Over 150 relatives and friends attended the reception.

Career

Pharmacy

In 1928, Stein established the Arlington Pharmacy at 299 Arlington Avenue, Kensington, California (now a coffee and cheese market). The pharmacy was on the corner of Amherst and Arlington Avenue. He operated the pharmacy for 36 years until he retired in 1964. The pharmacy included a soda fountain, a U.S. Post Office and a lending library.

In 1956, he established the Pharmacy Museum at the Columbia State Historic Park in Columbia, California. The Pharmacy Museum depicts a California pharmacy of the late 19th-century with authentic furnishings and pharmaceutical ground glass bottles. According to an article from  The Times, Stein advised Walt Disney on details for an authentic Main Street drug store at Disneyland.

Stein was past president of the California Pharmaceutical Association in San Francisco from 1955-56.

Railroad collection

Stein started collecting railroadiana and soon had a vast railroad collection, which later went to the California State Railroad Museum in Old Sacramento State Historic Park. He supervised the repair and reconstruction of one of the East Bay's oldest horsecars (horse-drawn streetcar) in his backyard, which was in service between Temescal, Oakland and the University of California in Berkeley. The horsecar is now at the Western Railway Museum near Rio Vista, California. The Louis Lorenz Stein, Jr. collection at the California State Railroad Museum represents railroad related papers and documents from 1873 to 1879.

Photographs from the Louis L. Stein, Jr. Collection are part of the Railroad Museum's photograph collection. An example railroad photograph is the 1940s City of San Francisco passenger train.

In July 1971, at a luncheon attended by over 200 historians, the California Historical Society presented Director Louis Stein their top honor for an individual, the Award of Merit. The award was presented by former United States Senator from California, William F. Knowland.

Historical societies

Stein and his wife were founding members of the Arlington Community Church and he was an ex-honorary Mayor of Kensington. He was an active leader in the Alameda County Historical Society, History Guild of the Oakland Museum of California, California Heritage Council, E Clampus Vitus, Railway and Locomotive Historical Society, UC Berkeley Bears Baackers, US Olympic Committee, The Live Oak Athletic Club and the Berkeley-Albany High 12 Club. Stein gave illustrated lectures before civic, fraternal, school, social, political and business groups.

Stein had a passion for history and collected letters, diaries, manuscripts, photographs, maps, newspapers and historical artifacts. On February 9, 1955, he and his wife Midred bought the Vicente Martinez Adobe, built in 1849, for $25,000 to save it from being razed and subdivided. It is now part of the John Muir National Historic Site.

In July 1978, Stein purchased in a county auction, a historic 500-pound bell that hung in the tower at the Contra Costa County courthouse in Martinez, California, which was built in 1852. Stein donated the bell that was placed in the Borland Home in Martinez, which was restored by the Martinez Historical Society to serve as a city museum.

In the early 1980s, Stein donated 80 boxes of his historical collections, dating from 1858-1920, relating to Contra Costa County, California to the Contra Costa County Historical Society, which he helped found. The manuscripts, documents, maps, photographs, newspapers, and ephemera, about 50,000 items, are now in the History Center.

The Stein Collection at the Contra Costa County Historical Society includes the following photographs:

 Independent Mine in Somersville, California
 Etching of Black Diamond town, now Pittsburg, California
 Walnut Creek, California Main Street
 Concord, California street scene
 Concord Drug Store on Main Street
 San Ramon Valley Union High School in Danville, California
 Louis Stein at work in the attic office of his home in Kensington
 Clubhouse Oakwood Stock Farm in Mount Diablo

Death

Stein died of natural causes on November 11, 1996, at Walnut Creek, California, at age 94. A memorial service was held at the Arlington Community Church in Kensington and interment at the Sunset View Cemetery in El Cerrito, California. His wife, Mildred Slater-Stein, died on 20 May 1989 at Berkeley at the age of 86.

See also

 List of pharmacists
 List of historians

External links
 A guide to the Louis L. Stein, Jr. photograph collection, 1880-1950
 Contra Costa County Historical Society
 A question on history? Ask Louis Stein The Berkeley Gazette, 23 May 1978

References

1902 births
1996 deaths
Businesspeople from California
American pharmacists
University of California alumni
Historians of the United States
People from Berkeley, California